Euronet may refer to:
 Euronat
 Euronet Worldwide, a global provider of electronic payment services
 Euronet (telecommunications network), a telecommunications network in Europe using X.25 (see Packet switching § Euronet)